Jazz Reunion is an album by saxophonist Coleman Hawkins and clarinetist Pee Wee Russell which was recorded in 1961 and released on the Candid label.

Reception

Allmusic reviewer Scott Yanow stated: "Russell was beginning to perform much more modern material than the Dixieland music ... Hawkins is also in fine form and this somewhat surprising program is quite successful".

Track listing 
 "If I Could Be with You (One Hour Tonight)" (James P. Johnson, Henry Creamer) – 6:30
 "Tin Tin Deo" (Chano Pozo, Gil Fuller) – 8:57
 "Mariooch" (Pee Wee Russell, Nat Pierce, Milt Hinton) – 7:21
 "All Too Soon" (Duke Ellington, Carl Sigman) – 7:34
 "28th and 8th" (Russell, Pierce) – 7:27
 "What Am I Here For?"  (Ellington, Frankie Laine) – 7:54

Personnel 
Pee Wee Russell – clarinet
Coleman Hawkins – tenor saxophone
Bob Brookmeyer – valve trombone
Emmett Berry – trumpet
Nat Pierce – piano
Milt Hinton – bass
Jo Jones - drums

References 

1961 albums
Coleman Hawkins albums
Pee Wee Russell albums
Candid Records albums
Albums produced by Nat Hentoff